Willi Herren (17 June 1975 – 20 April 2021) was a German actor and singer.

Filmography
Der bewegte Mann (1994)
Die Wache (1994, 2001, 2002)
Entführung aus der Lindenstraße (1995)
Jede Menge Leben (1996)
Ein Bayer auf Rügen (1996)
Ein Fall für zwei (1997)
Nikola (1997)
Lola and Billy the Kid (1999)
Nesthocker – Familie zu verschenken (2000)
SK Kölsch (2001)
St. Angela (2001, 2002)
Tatort (2002)
Hallo Robbie! (2002, 2005)
Das Amt (2002)
Verbotene Liebe (2003)
Cologne P.D. (2003)
Hausmeister Krause – Ordnung muss sein (2007)
Alerta Cobra (2008)
Einstein (2018)

References

1975 births
2021 deaths
German male actors
Actors from Cologne